Deva Maanava (Kannada: ದೇವಮಾನವ) is a 1966 Indian Kannada film, directed by C. P. Jambulingam and produced by Raavana. The film stars Udaykumar, Jayanthi, B Vijayalakshmi and B. V. Radha. The film has musical score by S. M. Subbaiah Naidu.

Cast
Udaykumar
Jayanthi
B Vijayalakshmi
B. V. Radha

References

1960s Kannada-language films